Hebei opera may refer to these Chinese opera forms from Hebei province:

Ping opera, originally from northern Hebei
Hebei bangzi, originally from southern Hebei